The 2009 Volkswagen Jetta TDI Cup was the Volkswagen Jetta TDI Cup's second season. In 2009 10 races were set to take place on eight circuits. Both Virginia International Raceway and New Jersey Motorsports Park were doubleheader events hosting two rounds each. There are also four new tracks for the 2009 season, Miller Motorsports Park, Mid-Ohio Sports Car Course, Autobahn Country Club, and Road America. Gone for the season are Iowa Speedway and Lime Rock Park.

Also new for this season is a new fuel from Hyperfuels, the official supplier for the TDI Cup. This year all the race cars, as well as all the vehicle/equipment transporters and generators used by the series, will run SynDiesel B5 Biodiesel. Late in the 2008 season, Pirelli announced that they would be the official tire supplier for the 2009 season.

Drivers

Season results

Drivers Championship

Race result links
Race #1 
Race #2 
Race #3 
Race #4 
Race #5

References
Link to Official SCCA Regulations. Article 1 is general regulations. Article 4 is Jetta TDI Cup regulations.

External links
 Official Website

Volkswagen Jetta Tdi Cup
Volkswagen Jetta TDI Cup